The following is an list of articles relating to the Indian state of Nagaland, sorted in alphabetical order.

Quick index 



0–9

13 
 13th Nagaland Assembly

19 
 1964 Nagaland Legislative Assembly election
 1969 Nagaland Legislative Assembly election
 1974 Nagaland Legislative Assembly election
 1977 Nagaland Legislative Assembly election
 1982 Nagaland Legislative Assembly election
 1986 Killings of Kekuojalie Sachü and Vikhozo Yhoshü
 1987 Nagaland Legislative Assembly election
 1989 Nagaland Legislative Assembly election
 1993 Nagaland Legislative Assembly election
 1994 Mokokchung Massacre
 1995 Kohima massacre
 1996 Dimapur car bombing
 1998 Nagaland Legislative Assembly election

20 
 2003 Nagaland Legislative Assembly election
 2004 Dimapur bombings
 2008 Nagaland Legislative Assembly election
 2013 Nagaland Legislative Assembly election
 2018 Nagaland Legislative Assembly election
 2017 Nagaland protests
 2021 Nagaland killings
 2022 Nagaland Olympic & Paralympic Games
 2023 Kohima fire

A

Ab 
 Aboi Assembly constituency
 Abraham Lotha

Ag 
 Aghunato
 Aghunato Assembly constituency
 Agri Farm Ward

Ai 
 AIR FM Tragopan

Al 
 Alder College
 Alobo Naga

Ak 
 Akhuni
 Aki Kiti
 Akuluto
 Akuluto Assembly constituency

Al 
 Alichen
 Alongtaki Assembly constituency

An 
 Andrea Kevichüsa
 Angami Baptist Church Council
 Angami language
 Angami Naga
 Angami–Pochuri languages
 Angami Women Organization
 Angami Zapu Phizo
 Angetyongpang Assembly constituency
 Angh

Ao 
 Ao language
 Ao languages
 Ao Naga
 Aoleang
 Aonglenden Assembly constituency
 Aoyim

Ar 
 Arkakong Assembly constituency

At 
 Atoizü Assembly constituency

B

Ba 
 Bade, Chümoukedima District
 Baptist College, Kohima
 Battle of Kohima
 Battle of the Tennis Court
 Bayavü Hill Ward

Bh 
 Bhandari Assembly constituency

C

Ca 
 Capi (Newspaper)
 Capital College of Higher Education

Ce 
 C-Edge College

Ch 
 Chalie Kevichüsa
 Chakhesang Naga
 Chang language
 Chang Naga
 Changtongya
 Chathe
 Chekiye
 Chekrovolü Swüro
 Chiephobozou
 Chingwang Konyak
 Chirr language
 Chishi
 Chizami Assembly constituency
 Chokri language
 Chotisüh Sazo
 Chozuba
 Chozuba Assembly constituency
 Christian Institute of Health Sciences and Research
 Christianity in Nagaland
 Chubatoshi Apok Jamir
 Chuchuyimlang
 Chümoukedima
 Chümoukedima district
 Chümoukedima Metropolitan Area
 Chungli Ao language

Cm 
 C. M. Chang

Co 
 Colored Keys
 COVID-19 pandemic in Nagaland

D

Da 
 Daklane Ward
 Dainty Buds School

Db 
 D. Block Ward

De 
 Democratic Alliance of Nagaland

Dh 
 Dhansiri–Zubza line

Di 
 Diezephe
 Dimapur
 Dimapur Airport
 Dimapur district
 Dimapur Government College
 Dimapur I Assembly constituency
 Dimapur II Assembly constituency
 Dimapur III Assembly constituency
 Dimapur–Kohima Expressway
 Dimapur railway station

Do 
 Dolly Kikon
 Doyang
 Doyang Hydro Electric Project

Dr 
 Dreams & Chaos
 Dreams & Chaos (book)

Dz 
 Dzüko Valley
 Dzüleke
 Dzülhami
 Dzüvürü Ward

E

Ea 
 Easterine Kire
 Eastern Christian College, Dimapur
 Eastern Mirror

El 
 Elections in Nagaland
 Electrical Ward

Em 
 Emblem of Nagaland

En 
 Englan

Et 
 Ethnic conflict in Nagaland

F

Fa 
 Fazl Ali College

Fe 
 Fernwood School

Fo 
 Forest Ward, Kohima

G

Ga 
 Galho
 Gaan-Ngai

Ge 
 George Keduolhou Angami

Gh 
 Ghaspani I Assembly constituency
 Ghaspani II Assembly constituency

Gk 
 G. Kaito Aye

Go 
 Government of Nagaland

Gr 
 G. Rio School

H

He 
 Hekani Jakhalu Kense

Hi 
 History of the Nagas

Hk 
 H. K. Sema

Ho 
 Hokaito Zhimomi
 Hokishe Sema
 Holshe Khrie-o
 Hornbill Festival
 Hornbill TV
 Hovithal Sothü

I

Ic 
 ICFAI University, Nagaland

Im 
 Imchalemba
 Immanuel Higher Secondary School, Zunheboto
 Impur
 Impur Assembly constituency
 Imtikümzük Longkümer
 Imtilemba Sangtam

In 
 Index of Kohima-related articles
 Index of Viswema-related articles
 Indira Gandhi Stadium, Kohima

Is 
 Isak Chishi Swu

J

Ja 
 Jail Ward
 Jain Temple Kohima
 Jakhama
 James Kithan
 Jamir (surname)
 Jangpetkong Assembly constituency
 Japfü Christian College

Ji 
 Jina and Etiben

Jo 
 John Bosco Jasokie
 John Government Higher Secondary School
 Jonathan Yhome
 Jotsoma

K

Ka 
 Kapamüdzü
 K. Asungba Sangtam

Ke 
 Kenuozou Hill Ward
 Kevichüsa Angami
 Kewhira Dielie
 Kezol–tsa Forest

Kh 
 Khaibung
 Kheza language
 Khezhakeno
 Khiamniungan language
 Khiamniungan people
 Khodao Yanthan
 Khonoma
 Khonoma Nature Conservation and Tragopan Sanctuary
 Khuzama
 Khriehu Liezietsu
 Khriezephe
 Khwetelhi Thopi

Ki 
 Kikon
 Kigwema
 Kihoto Hollohon
 Kiphire
 Kiphire district
 Kirha
 Kisama Heritage Village
 Kitsübozou Ward
 Kivi Zhimomi
 Kiyaneilie Peseyie

Kl 
 K. L. Chishi

Ko 
 Kohima
 Kohima (disambiguation)
 Kohima Ao Baptist Church
 Kohima Botanical Garden
 Kohima Capital Cultural Center
 Kohima Chiethu Airport
 Kohima district
 Kohima Komets
 Kohima Law College
 Kohima Lotha Baptist Church
 Kohima Municipal Council
 Kohima North Police Station
 Kohima Science College
 Kohima Stone Inscription
 Kohima Town Assembly constituency
 Kohima Village
 Kohima War Cemetery
 Kohima Zubza Railway Station
 Konyak language
 Konyak languages
 Konyak Naga
 Koridang Assembly constituency
 Koso (Naga surname)

Kr 
 Kropol Vitsü
 KROS College, Kohima

Ku 
 Kuda Village

L

La 
 Lake Shilloi
 Lakhüti
 Langpangkong Range

Le 
 Lerie Ward

Lh 
 Lhüthiprü Vasa

Li 
 Liangmei Naga
 Liezietsü
 List of airports in Nagaland
 List of chief ministers of Nagaland
 List of deputy chief ministers of Nagaland
 List of districts of Nagaland
 List of governors of Nagaland
 List of higher education and academic institutions in Kohima
 List of hospitals in Nagaland
 List of institutions of higher education in Nagaland
 List of massacres in Nagaland
 List of Monuments of National Importance in Nagaland
 List of mountains in Nagaland
 List of Naga people
 List of Naga politicians
 List of newspapers in Nagaland
 List of people of Angami descent
 List of railway stations in Nagaland
 List of Rajya Sabha members from Nagaland
 List of rivers in Nagaland
 List of schools in Nagaland
 List of traditional Naga festivals
 List of traditional Naga games and sports

Lk 
 L. Kijungluba Ao

Lo 
 Longkhim–Chare Assembly constituency
 Longkümer
 Longleng
 Longleng district
 Longleng Assembly constituency
 Longri Ao
 Lotha language
 Lotha Naga
 Lower Mediezie Ward
 Lower Chandmari Ward
 Lower Police Reserve Hill Ward
 Lower PWD Ward

Lu 
 Lumami

M

Ma 
 Macnivil
 Mary Help of Christians Cathedral, Kohima
 Matikhrü
 Matikhrü Massacre
 Mayangnokcha Ao

Me 
 Medziphema
 Meluri Assembly constituency
 Mengujüma
 Mengu Süokhrie
 Merhülietsa Ward
 Methaneilie Solo
 Metsübo Jamir
 Mezhür Higher Secondary School
 Mezoma

Mi 
 Middle PWD Ward
 Midland Ward
 Ministers' Hill Baptist Higher Secondary School
 Miss Nagaland

Mm 
 Mmhonlümo Kikon

Mo 
 Moatsü
 Model Christian College, Kohima
 Moka Assembly constituency
 Mokokchung
 Mokokchung district
 Mokokchung Town Assembly constituency
 Mokokchung Village
 Molvom
 Molvom Railway Station
 Monalisa Changkija
 Mon district
 Mongoya Assembly constituency
 Mongsen Ao language
 Mon Town
 Mon Town Assembly constituency
 Mopungchuket
 Mount Mary College, Chümoukedima
 Mount Japfü
 Mount Saramati

Mu 
 Mungmung
 Municipal Wards of Kohima
 Mürise
 Music of Nagaland

N

Na 
 Naga Bazaar Ward
 Naga cuisine
 Naga folklore
 Naga Hills District, British India
 Naga Hospital Authority
 Naga Hospital Ward
 Nagaland
 Nagaland Baptist Church Council
 Nagaland Cricket Association
 Nagaland Cricket Association Stadium
 Nagaland cricket team
 Nagaland football team
 Nagaland Information Commission
 Nagaland Legislative Assembly
 Nagaland Liquor Total Prohibition Act, 1989
 Nagaland Lok Adalat
 Nagaland Lokayukta
 Nagaland (Lok Sabha constituency)
 Nagaland Medical College
 Nagaland Nationalist Organisation
 Nagaland Page
 Nagaland Peace Accord
 Nagaland Police
 Nagaland Post
 Nagaland Pradesh Congress Committee
 Nagaland Premier League
 Nagaland State Election Commission
 Nagaland State Library
 Nagaland State Museum
 Nagaland University
 Nagaland women's cricket team
 Nagaland Wrestling Association
 Nagaland Zoological Park
 Naga people
 Naga People's Front
 Naga Students' Federation
 Naga United
 Naga Wrestling Championship
 Naginimora
 NAJ Cosfest
 Nana: A Tale of Us
 National Institute of Technology, Nagaland
 Nationalist Democratic Progressive Party
 National Research Centre on Mithun
 National Socialist Council of Nagaland

Nb 
 N. Bongkhao Konyak

Ne 
 Neiba Kronu
 Neichülie-ü Nikki Haralu
 Neidonuo Angami
 Neikezhakuo Kengurüse
 Neiliezhü Üsou
 Neiphiu Rio
 New Market Ward
 New Ministers' Hill Ward
 New Reserve Ward

Ni 
 Niuland district

No 
 Noklak
 Noklak district
 Noklak Assembly constituency
 Noksen Assembly constituency
 North East Zone Cultural Centre
 Northern Angami I Assembly constituency
 Northern Angami II Assembly constituency
 Northfield School, Kohima

Nt 
 Ntangki National Park
 Ntenyi language

O

Ol 
 Old Ministers' Hill Ward

On 
 Ongpangkong

Ou 
 Outline of Kohima

Or 
 Oriental Theological Seminary

P

Pa 
 Pangti
 Patkai Christian College

Pc 
 Pcheda

Pe 
 Peraciezie Ward
 Peren (town)
 Peren Assembly constituency
 Peren district
 Peren Government College

Pf 
 Pfütsero
 Pfütsero Government College
 Pfütsero Assembly constituency

Ph 
 Phangnon Konyak
 Phek
 Phek district
 Phek Assembly constituency
 Phomching Assembly constituency
 Phom language
 Phom Naga

Pi 
 Piyong Temjen Jamir

Pk 
 P. Kilemsungla

Po 
 Pochuri language
 Pochury Naga
 Police Reserve Hill Ward
 Politics of Nagaland
 Porba

Pp 
 P. Paiwang Konyak

Ps 
 P. Shilu Ao

Pu 
 Public College of Commerce
 Pughoboto
 Pughoboto Assembly constituency
 Pulie Badze
 Pulie Badze Wildlife Sanctuary
 Pungro Kiphire Assembly constituency

R

Ra 
 Raj Bhavan, Kohima
 Rano M. Shaiza
 Razhukhrielie Kevichüsa

Re 
 Regional Centre of Excellence for Music & Performing Arts
 Reivilie Angami
 Rengma language
 Rengma Naga

Ro 
 Roman Catholic Diocese of Kohima
 Rongsen Jonathan

Ru 
 Ruins of Kachari Rajbari
 Rüzaphema

S

Sa 
 Sainik School, Punglwa
 Sakhrie Park
 Sakraba
 Salesian College of Higher Education
 Salhoutuonuo Kruse
 Sangtam language
 Sangtam Naga
 Sanis Assembly constituency
 S. Anungla
 Satakha
 Satakha Assembly constituency

Se 
 Sechü Zubza
 Sekrenyi
 Sepfüzou Ward
 Sesino Yhoshü
 Seyochung–Sitimi Assembly constituency

Sc 
 S. C. Jamir

Sh 
 Shalom Bible Seminary
 Shamator district
 Shamator–Chessore Assembly constituency
 Sharingain Longkümer
 Shokhuvi Railway Station
 Shikiho Sema
 Shürhozelie Liezietsu

Si 
 Silas Kikon

So 
 Sodzülhou
 Sopfünuo
 Southern Angami
 Southern Angami I Assembly constituency
 Southern Angami II Assembly constituency
 Southern Angami Public Organization
 Sovima

St 
 St. Joseph's College, Jakhama
 St. Joseph University, Nagaland

Su 
 Sümi language
 Sümi Naga
 Suruhoto Assembly constituency

Sw 
 Swe–ba

T

Ta 
 Talimeren Ao
 Tamlu Assembly constituency
 Tapi Assembly constituency
 Tati (instrument)

Te 
 Tehok Assembly constituency
 Te–l Khukhu
 Temjen Imna Along
 Tening Assembly constituency
 Tenyiphe I
 Tenyiphe II
 Temsüla Ao
 Tetseo Sisters
 Tetso College
 Teyozwü Hill

Th 
 Thegabakha Ward
 The Morung Express
 The Pangti Story
 Thepfülo-u Nakhro
 Thonoknyu Assembly constituency

Ti 
 Tikhir language
 Timeline of Naga history
 Tizit Assembly constituency

To 
 Tobu Assembly constituency
 Tokheho Yepthomi
 Tokhü Emong
 Tongpang Ozüküm

Tr 
 Trinity Theological College, Dimapur
 T. R. Zeliang

Ts 
 Tseilhoutuo Rhütso
 Tseminyü
 Tseminyü district
 Tseminyü Assembly constituency
 Tsiepfü Tsiepfhe Ward
 Tsüngkotepsü

Tt 
 T. Torechu

Tu 
 Tubu Kevichüsa
 Tuensang
 Tuensang district
 Tuensang Sadar I Assembly constituency
 Tuensang Sadar II Assembly constituency
 Tuli College
 Tuli, India
 Tuli Assembly constituency

Ty 
 Tyüi Assembly constituency

Tz 
 Tzürangkong

U

Un 
 Ungma
 United Democratic Alliance (Nagaland)
 Unity College, Dimapur

Up 
 Upper Mediezie Ward
 Upper Chandmari Ward
 Upper PWD Ward

Ur 
 Ura Mail
 Urra Village

V

Va 
 Vamüzo Phesao

Vi 
 Vidima
 Vikho-o Yhoshü
 Virazouma
 Viseyie Koso
 Viswema
 Viswema Hall
 Viswesül Pusa
 Vizol Koso
 Vizadel Sakhrie

W

Wa 
 Wakching Assembly constituency
 Wangkhao Government College
 Wati Aier

We 
 Western Angami Assembly constituency

Wo 
 Wokha
 Wokha district
 Wokha Assembly constituency

Y

Ya 
 Yanthungo Patton

Ye 
 Yemhi Memorial College

Yh 
 Yhoshü

Yi 
 Yikhüm
 Yimkhiung Naga
 Yimkhiungrü language
 Yimyu
 Yingli College, Longleng

Yo 
 YouthNet

Z

Za 
 Zale Neikha

Ze 
 Zeme language
 Zemeic language
 Zeme Naga
 Zeliangrong

Zh 
 Zhaleo Rio
 Zhokhoi Chüzho

Zi 
 Zisaji Presidency College

Zu 
 Zuboni Hümtsoe
 Zünheboto
 Zünheboto district
 Zünheboto Sümi Baptist Church
 Zünheboto Assembly constituency
 Zutho

See also 
 Outline of Nagaland

Nagaland-related lists